Kadanganeri is a village located at Alangulam Taluk in Tenkasi district of Tamil Nadu, India. Kadanganeri is a Village Panchayat comes under Alangulam block.

Weather

Population
Overall Population is 8250, in this Male is 4092 & Female is 4158 and total households residing are 2224.

Education
Literacy rate in Kadanganeri is good.

Schools
The village has one primary school, which is named as "Saraswathi Vidhyalaya School" and two Anganwadies for child. Then one Higher Secondary School is placed near to this village named as "Grama Committee Higher Secondary School".

Colleges
The village has no colleges. But there is "CSI Jayaraj Annapackiam College for Arts and Science" near to this, it is 10 km away from this village. Other than this college, few colleges are chosen by our village students, they are listed below:
 The Madurai Diraviyam Thayumanavar Hindu College - Pettai, Tirunelveli, Tamil Nadu 627010
 Rani Anna Arts and Science college for women - Gandhi Nager [Tirunelveli]
 Einstein College of Engineering - Seethaparpanallur [Tirunelveli]
 Sarthar Raja Engineering college - Athiyuthu [Alangulam]
 ST.Mariyam Polytechnic - Alangulam
 ST.Xavier's College - Palayamkottai 
 ST.John's College - Palayamkottai
 Saradha Arts and Science college for women - Tirunelveli
 Sarah Tucker Arts and Science college for women - Palayamkottai

Temples

Hindu temples
 Amman Kovil
 Ulagamman Kovil
 Karuppasamy Kovil
 Kaikonda Ayyanaar Kovil
 Emperumal Sastha Seevalaperi Sudalai Madan Kovil
 Pillai Valathi Sastha Kovil
 Piraiyadi Madan Kovil
 Pillaiyar Kovil
 Murugan Kovil
 Esakki Amman Kovil
 Sarkkaravittu thiru Kovil
 Kaattu Madan Kovil
 Karguvel Ayyanar Kovil
 Vadakkuthi Amman Kovil
 Kathavarayan kovil
 Sappanimadan kovil

Festivals

Amman Kovil Festival
In the month of Panguni (பங்குனி) and Purattaasi (புரட்டாசி), yearly two times. Common for all village people.

 Main God: 
 Pathrakali amman - பத்ரகாளி அம்மன் 
 Muttharamman - முத்தாரம்மன்

Car festival [தேரோட்டம்] will be held in the month of Panguni (பங்குனி). It will start on 2nd day night and will be complete early morning of next day. Car festival will cover all the streets in Kadanganeri.

Ulagamman Kovil Festival
In the month of Aippasi (ஐப்பசி), yearly one time. Celebrated by Uvari Suyampulinga Sastha Vagayaraakkal

 Main God: 
 Suyampulinga Saasthaa - சுயம்புலிங்க சாஸ்தா

Karuppasamy Kovil Festival

In the month of Aadi (ஆடி) temple festival will be Celebrated by Nattamai Vagayaraakkal [Megalinga Sastha Vagayaraakkal]

 Main God: 
 Megalinga Saasthaa - மேகலிங்க சாஸ்தா
 Karuppasamy - கருப்பசாமி

in the year of 2015, temple was reconstructed and inaugurated on 29JUN2015.

Kaikonda Ayyanaar Kovil Festival
In the month of Aadi (ஆடி) temple festival will be Celebrated by Kaikonda Ayyanaar Sastha Vagayaraakkal
 
 Main God: 
 Kaikonda Ayyanaar - கைக்கொண்ட அய்யனார்

Em Perumal Sastha Kovil Festival
In the month of Aadi (ஆடி) every year, celebrated by Emperumal Sastha Vagayaraakkal

 Main God: 
 Em Perumal Sastha
 Sudalai Madan - சுடலை மாடன்

Pillai Valathi Sastha Kovil Festival
In the month of Aadi (ஆடி), one time/2 year. Celebrated by Pillai Valathi Sastha Vagayaraakkal

 Main God: 
 Pillai Valatthi Saasthaa - பிள்ளை வளர்த்தி சாஸ்தா

Esakki Amman Kovil Festival
In the month of Thai (தை), yearly one time.

 Main God: 
 Esakki Amman - இசக்கி அம்மன்

Karguvel Ayyanar Kovil Festival
In the month of Vaigasi (வைகாசி), yearly one time. Celebrated by Karguvel Ayyanar Sastha Vagayaraakkal

 Main God: 
 Karkuvel Ayyanar - கற்குவேல் அய்யனார்

Vadakkuthi Amman Kovil Festival
This temple festival will be combined with Amman Kovil festival.

 Main God: 
 Amman - அம்மன்

Churches
 Christ Church - Church of South India.

Mosque
 None

Profession

Agriculture plays a vital role in the village economy. Men work in agriculture and women are support to them. However most of women are beedi rollers. Beedi rolling is the second profession. 99.99% of the people having own land for agriculture. 0.01% people are coolies; they work in palm fiber factories. The palm fibers are exported to another place to be spin into rope.

Tourist places
The nearest main tourist places are:
 Courtallam - 39.6 km distance from Kadanganeri. Courtallam is situated at the Western Ghats in Tenkasi Taluk. The famous waterfalls on rocks and tiny droplets are sprinkled in the air. The water falls of Courtalam have medicinal value as they run through forest and herbs before their descent.
 Papanasam, Tirunelveli - 44.1 km distance from Kadanganeri
 Agasthiyar Falls - 46.8 km distance from Kadanganeri. Agasthiar falls also attracts tourist and pilgrims
 Sorimuthu Ayyanar Temple - 55.6 km distance from Kadanganeri.
 Karaiyar Dam - 58.5 km distance from Kadanganeri.
 Kalakadu - 60.6 km distance from Kadanganeri. There is a Wild life sanctuary, Spotted deers, Liontailed monkeys, Elephants and Tigers are plenty.
 Mundanthurai Tiger Reserve - 56.1 km distance from Kadanganeri. There is a Wild life sanctuary, Spotted deers, Liontailed monkeys, Elephants and Tigers are plenty.
 Thenmala, Kerala - 70.0 km distance from Kadanganeri.

Directions / Transports

Route guide
Alangulam -Kadanganeri (13 km) Via: Alangulam, Tirunelveli-Kuruvankottai, Kurippankulam, Maruthappapuram, Nettur-Kadanganeri.
Tirunelveli-Kadanganeri (41 km) Via: Tirunelveli-Azhakiyapandipuram, Vagaikkulam, Ukkirankottai, Reddiyarpatti (V.W.Puram)-Kadanganeri.
Sankarankovil-Kadanganeri (41 km) Via: Sankarankovil-Utthumalai-Kadanganeri.

Bus / Transport
Government Buses 
19 ^Alangulam <=> Azhagiyapandiyapuram
21 ^Surandai <=> Reddiyarpatti (V.W.Puram)
5c ^Alangulam <=> Azhagiyapandiyapuram
261 ^Ambasamudram <=> Sankarankovil
159 ^Ambasamudram <=> Sankarankovil
43d ^Alangulam <=> Devarkulam
 LSS ^Tirunelveli <=> Puliyankudi
SFS ^Tenkasi <=> Azhakiyapandipuram

Private Buses (Indoors)
KR (KASI) ^Ambasamudram <=> Sankarankovil
SST (சீதாபதி) ^Ambasamudram <=> Azhagiyapandiyapuram
TPC Raja ^Tirunelveli <=> Surandai

Private

The buses start from Alangulam.
Ashwin Travels ^Alangulam <=> Chennai
National Travels ^Alangulam <=> Chennai
Apple Travels ^Alangulam <=> Chennai

The buses are start from Reddiyarpatti (V.W.Puram) then you have to reach Reddiyarpatti bus stop to board the bus.
SBT Travels ^Reddiyarpatti (V.W.Puram) <=> Chennai
AVK Travels ^Reddiyarpatti (V.W.Puram) <=> Chennai

Railways
Tenkasi Junction
Station Code - TSI
Distance - 34.7 KM
TIRUNELVELI Junction
Station Code - TEN
Distance - 37.6 KM

Airports
Tuticorin Airport - 66 KM
Trivandrum International Airport - 93 KM
Madurai Airport - 133 KM மேலும் கடங்கநேரி டு சென்னை பஸ் புக்கிங் பெயர் பிரகாஷ் தமிழன் மொபைலில் ஆரம்பிக்கப்பட்டது இந்த பேருந்து ஆனது சென்னைவாழ் கடங்கநேரி மக்களுக்கு அதிகமாக பயன்பட்டு வருகிறது கடங்கநேரி டு சென்னை முதல் பேருந்து நேஷனல் டிராவல்ஸ் இது ஆரம்பத்தில் இருந்து மக்களின் மனதில் நீங்கா இடம் பெற்ற பேருந்து இந்த பேருந்து ஆலங்குளத்தில் இருந்து வி கே புதூர் வழியாக வீராணம் கடங்கநேரி ரெட்டியார்பட்டி அழகியபாண்டியபுரம் வழியாக சென்னை செல்லும் டிக்கெட்டின் விலை முதல் 450 ரூபாய் இருந்தது தற்சமயம் 2019 வருடம் ஒரு டிக்கெட்டின் விலை சராசரியாக 680 ரூபாய்

Entertainment and leisure
There is a Cinema Theatre in Alangulam, named as ''TPV MULTIPLEX'', equipped with two screen along with dolby digital sound effects.

References

http://www.rootvinn.com/kadanganeri-village-164621
http://wikiedit.org/India/Kadanganeri/233636/
http://soki.in/kadanganeri-alangulam-tirunelveli/

Villages in Tirunelveli district